Santa Quitéria Futebol Clube, commonly known as Santa Quitéria, is a Brazilian football club based in Santa Quitéria do Maranhão, Maranhão state. They competed in the Copa do Brasil once.

History 
The club was founded on March 16, 2003. Santa Quitéria won the Campeonato Maranhense Second Level in 2005, and in 2009. Santa Quitéria was runners-up in the 2010 Campeonato Maranhense, losing the competition to Sampaio Corrêa.

They competed in Copa do Brasil in 2012, the club was eliminated in first stage by ASA.

Achievements 

 Campeonato Maranhense Second Level:
 Winners (2): 2005, 2009

Stadium 
Santa Quitéria Futebol Clube play their home games at Estádio Daniel Rodrigues Leal, nicknamed Rodrigão. The stadium has a maximum capacity of 13,500 people.

References 

Football clubs in Maranhão
Association football clubs established in 2003
2003 establishments in Brazil